Swiss Pines is a  arboretum and Japanese garden located on Charlestown Road, Malvern, Pennsylvania.

Swiss Pines was established by Arnold Bartschi (1903-1996), born in Switzerland and by the mid-1930s, owner of the J. Edwards Shoe Company. It became a nonprofit foundation in 1960.

At present, Swiss Pines displays a Japanese tea house and garden, a stone garden, statuary, streams, lake, stone lanterns, and bridges set among naturalistic plantings. Plant collections include the Glendale Azalea Garden (150 varieties); the herb garden (100 species), the groundcover garden (28 varieties), and the pinetum (over 200 types of conifers).

Per the Charlestown Township website, Swiss Pines was closed for the foreseeable future as of 2013. However, in 2019 long-term restoration efforts began, including the establishment of the Sanrin Cultural Arts Center on the property. While they are accepting volunteers and members, Swiss Pines continues to be closed to the public during the restoration period.

See also 
 List of botanical gardens in the United States

References

External links 
 

1960 establishments in Pennsylvania
Arboreta in Pennsylvania
Botanical gardens in Pennsylvania
Japanese gardens in the United States
Parks in Chester County, Pennsylvania
Swiss-American culture in Pennsylvania